The 2004 Sultan Qaboos Cup was the 32nd edition of the Sultan Qaboos Cup, the premier knockout tournament for football teams in Oman.

The competition began on 15 September 2004 with the Round of 32 and concluded on 23 November 2004. Ruwi Club were the defending champions, having won their first title in 2003. On Tuesday 23 November 2004, Dhofar S.C.S.C. were crowned the champions of the 2004 Sultan Qaboos Cup when they defeated Muscat Club 1-0, hence winning the title for the sixth time.

Teams
This year the tournament had 32 teams.
 Ahli Sidab Club (Sidab)
 Al-Ittihad Club (Salalah)
 Al-Khaboora SC (Al-Khaboora)
 Al-Mudhaibi SC (Al-Mudhaibi)
 Al-Musannah SC (Al-Musannah)
 Al-Nahda Club (Al-Buraimi)
 Al-Nasr S.C.S.C. (Salalah)
 Al-Oruba SC (Sur)
 Al-Rustaq SC (Rustaq)
 Al-Salam SC (Sohar)
 Al-Seeb Club (Seeb)
 Al-Shabab Club (Seeb)
 Al-Suwaiq Club (Suwaiq
 Al-Tali'aa SC (Sur)
 Al-Wahda SC (Sur)
 Bahla Club (Bahla)
 Dhofar S.C.S.C. (Salalah)
 Fanja SC (Fanja)
 Ibri Club (Ibri)
 Ja'lan SC (Jalan Bani Bu Ali)
 Madha SC  (Madha)
 Majees SC (Majees)
 Mirbat SC (Mirbat)
 Muscat Club (Muscat)
 Nizwa Club (Nizwa)
 Oman Club (Muscat)
 Quriyat Club (Quriyat)
 Saham SC (Saham)
 Salalah SC (Salalah)
 Sohar SC (Sohar)
 Sur SC (Sur)
 Yanqul SC (Yanqul)

Round of 32
32 teams played a knockout tie. 16 ties were played over one leg. The first match played was between Al-Nasr S.C.S.C. and Yanqul SC on 15 September 2004. 16 teams advanced to the Round of 16.

Round of 16
16 teams played a knockout tie. 8 ties were played over one leg. The first match was played between Al-Seeb Club and Al-Khaboora SC on 30 September 2004. 8 teams advanced to the Quarterfinals.

Quarterfinals
8 teams played a knockout tie. 4 ties were played over two legs. The first match was played between Sur SC and Al-Suwaiq Club on 17 October 2004. Sur SC, Dhofar S.C.S.C., Al-Nasr S.C.S.C. and Muscat Club qualified for the Semifinals.

1st Legs

2nd Legs

Semifinals
4 teams played a knockout tie. 2 ties were played over two legs. The first match was played between Muscat Club and Sur SC on 1 November 2004. Dhofar S.C.S.C. and Muscat Club qualified for the Finals.

1st Legs

2nd Legs

Third Place

Finals

References

External links
Oman Sultan Cup 2004-2005 at Goalzz.com

Sultan Qaboos Cup seasons
Cup